Phu Kao–Phu Phan Kham National Park is a national park in Thailand's Khon Kaen and Nong Bua Lamphu provinces. This mountainous park, in two separate sections, encompasses part of the Ubol Ratana Dam reservoir and also features rock formations and waterfalls. The park is named for the Phu Kao and Phu Phan Kham mountain ranges of the Khorat Plateau.

Geography
The park's area is 198,973 rai ~ . The park's western section is located in the Phu Kao mountain range and the eastern section in the Phu Phan Kham mountain range of the Phu Phan Mountains.

History
The park's western section is home to numerous caves hosting prehistoric rock paintings such as Tham Palan Hai, Tham Muem and Tham Rakha Khanit. Ancient artifacts of the Ban Chiang era have also been discovered in the area. The rock paintings and artifacts are estimated at more than 3,500 years old.

In 1985 the park was established as Thailand's 50th national park.

Attractions
Part of the Ubol Ratana Dam reservoir is in the park's eastern section and is located by the park headquarters. The rock formations at Ham Tang have been eroded by wind and water into unusual shapes such as a mushroom-like pillar.

The park's western section hosts the Tat Fa and Tat Hin Taek waterfalls. Tat Fa cascades through forest before falling  into a large pool. The western section is also home to the Wat Phra Phutthabat Phu Kao temple which hosts rock footprints of a human and a dog.

Flora and fauna
The park's main forest type is deciduous dipterocarp, especially in higher areas. Tree species here include Shorea roxburghii, Dipterocarpus obtusifolius, Olea brachiata and Cycas species.

Mixed deciduous forest occupies some lower elevations including along river banks. Tree species here include Burma padauk, wild almond and Ceylon oak.

Dry evergreen forest is found only along creeks and hosts such trees as tabaek, Dipterocarpus alatus and makha.

Bird life includes white wagtail, Richard's pipit, sooty-headed bulbul, streak-eared bulbul, oriental magpie-robin, greater coucal and common tailorbird.

See also
List of national parks of Thailand
List of Protected Areas Regional Offices of Thailand

References

National parks of Thailand
Geography of Khon Kaen province
Tourist attractions in Khon Kaen province
Geography of Nong Bua Lamphu province
Tourist attractions in Nong Bua Lamphu province
1985 establishments in Thailand
Protected areas established in 1985